Blaise Agüera y Arcas (born 1975) is an American software engineer, software architect, and designer. He is an authority in computer vision, machine intelligence, and computational photography and presents regularly at conferences.  He appears regularly at TED.

At Google, he leads teams that build products and technologies that leverage machine intelligence, computer vision, and computational photography. He also founded the Artists and Machine Intelligence program at Google, which creates art by pairing machine intelligence engineers with artists.

Prior to Google, he was a Distinguished Engineer at Microsoft and was the architect of Bing Maps and Bing Mobile.

Early life and education 
Blaise Agüera y Arcas was born in Providence, Rhode Island to a Spanish father and an American mother; they had met on an Israeli kibbutz. He grew up in Mexico City As a teenager, Agüera y Arcas interned with the U.S. Navy research center in Bethesda, Maryland, where he reprogrammed the guidance software for aircraft carriers to improve their stability at sea, which helped to reduce seasickness among sailors. In 1998 Agüera y Arcas graduated from Princeton University where he received a B.A. in physics.

Career
In 2001, Agüera y Arcas and Paul Needham  published their findings that the metal mold method of printing attributed to Gutenberg was likely invented by someone else, likely two decades after Gutenberg printed his Bible.

Seadragon and Microsoft 
In 2003, at the age of 27, Agüera y Arcas founded Seadragon Software, to create web optimized visualization technology that allowed graphics and photos to be smoothly browsed, regardless of their size.
In 2004 he devised a numerical method for the Library of Congress to create color composite images of almost two thousand negatives by Sergey Prokudin-Gorsky.

In 2006, Agüera y Arcas sold Seadragon to Microsoft Live Labs. The technology was used to develop Silverlight, Pivot, Photosynth and the standalone cross-platform Seadragon application for iPhone and iPad. Slate called Photosynth "the best thing to happen to digital photography since the digital camera".

He was the architect leading Bing Maps and Bing Mobile and was named a Distinguished Engineer in 2011. He collaborated with Ricoh to make the Theta, a 360º camera whose captured content displayed in Photosynth.

While at Microsoft, Agüera y Arcas also suggested that technology should be designed for women. He cited a gap between the extent to which technology is designed for women and the market opportunity women represent, given trends in graduation rates and earnings.

Google 
In 2013, Agüera y Arcas left Microsoft to become a leader of Google's machine intelligence efforts, along with programs in computer vision and computational photography.  His departure from Microsoft for Google generated a press cycle, with articles appearing in publications that included the New York Times,  Fast Company,  International Business Times, and ValueWalk.

As of 2016, he was working on projects that add deep learning to mobile devices. He founded the Artists and Machine Intelligence program, which fuses machine intelligence and art. The program's first public exhibit was on February 26, 2016 at the Gray Area, where Agüera y Arcas was the keynote speaker.  On June 1, 2016, the program held the MAMI (Music, Art, and Machine Intelligence) show.

In 2021, Aguera y Arcas published an opinion on his experience with the latest generation large language models in the form of AI chatbot LaMDA stating that "no objective answer is possible to the question of when an “it” becomes a “who” ".
In June 2022 Google engineer Blake Lemoine told Blaise Agüera y Arcas that the chatbot LaMDA had become sentient with its responses to questions regarding self-identity, moral values, religion, and Isaac Asimov's Three Laws of Robotics.

Personal life
He is married to Adrienne Fairhall, an Australian born theoretical physicist, with whom he has one child. They met during a neural network circuitry class at Marine Biological Laboratory in Woods Hole.

Works

TED Talks

Awards, press and other honors 
In 2008, he was named to the MIT Technology Review TR35 as one of the top 35 innovators in the world under the age of 35.

In 2009 and 2015 Fast Company has named him one of the "Most Creative People in Business" (2009, 2015), 

Agüera y Arcas is the inspiration for the character Elgin in the 2012 best-selling novel Where'd You Go, Bernadette?

In 2016, he spoke on KUOW about the future of machine intelligence in society.

References

External links
 Reconstructing Prokudin-Gorskii's Color Photography in Software, 2004
 Newsweek profile, 2008
 TR35 profile, 2008
  @blaiseaguera Twitter account
Blaise Agüera y Arcas at Medium Blogs 2016-2022
 Style is Violence blog
Blaise Agüera y Arcas at Google
 Library of Congress Name Authority File entry
 Virtual International Authority File entry
 
 "How PhotoSynth can connect the world's images" (TED2007)
 "Augmented-reality maps" (TED2010)

American software engineers
1975 births
Living people
Princeton University alumni
Google employees
Google Fellows
Microsoft employees
People from Mexico City